

France
 Pondichéry: Joseph Dupleix.

Oman
 Mombasa: Muhammad ibn Uthman al-Mazru‘i, Wali of Mombasa (1739–1745)

Portugal
 Angola: Joaquim Jacques de Magalhães, Governor of Angola (1738–1748)
 Macau: D. Diogo Pereira, Governor of Macau (1738–1743)

Colonial governors
Colonial governors
1742